Guillaume Bouisset (born 7 January 1973) is a French former professional footballer who played as a defender.

References

1973 births
Living people
Association football defenders
French footballers
FC Martigues players
En Avant Guingamp players
Red Star F.C. players
Amiens SC players
RC Lens players
Ligue 1 players
Ligue 2 players